Through Eyes of Men, also occasionally stylized as Thru Eyes of Men, is a 1920 American silent drama film directed by Charles A. Taylor and starring Frank Mayo, Prudence Lyle, and George Gebhardt. It was released in June 1920.

Cast list
 Frank Mayo as Franklyn Allen
 Prudence Lyle as Leila Leighton
 George Gebhardt as Berkaro
 Claire McDowell as Mrs. Virginia Allen
 Ben Alexander as Little Billy
 Dell Boone as Alice Weston

References

External links 
 
 
 

1920 drama films
1920 films
Silent American drama films
American silent feature films
American black-and-white films
1920s English-language films
1920s American films